Dadia-Lefkimi-Soufli Forest National Park (Greek: Εθνικό Πάρκο Δάσους Δαδιάς-Λευκίμης-Σουφλίου) is a national park in the region of Eastern Macedonia and Thrace, Greece. Local surveys have recorded at least 60 species of mammal, 12 of amphibian, 29 of reptile, and 104 of butterfly, alongside 360–400 plant species; birds include the Black vulture, Egyptian vulture, and Griffon vulture. In 2014, the National Park of Dadia - Lefkimi - Souflion was submitted for future inscription on the UNESCO World Heritage List, under criterion x; currently, the submission resides on the Tentative List.

See also

 List of World Heritage Sites in Greece
 National parks of Greece
 Dadia Forest

References

External links
 Dadia-Lefkimi-Soufli Forest National Park

2006 establishments in Greece
National parks of Greece
Evros (regional unit)
Protected areas established in 2006
World Heritage Tentative List